The 1994–95 Courage League National Division Three was the eighth full season of rugby union within the third tier of the English league system, currently known as National League 1. Bedford finished in first place and are promoted to National Division 2 for next season and they are joined by the runner-up, Blackheath; the teams finished 3rd and 4th respectively last season. Following their promotion last season Clifton finished 9th and are relegated to National League 4 along with the last-placed team Exeter.

Structure
The league consists of ten teams with all the teams playing each other on a home and away basis to make a total of eighteen matches each. There are two promotion places and two relegation places. The champions are promoted to National League 2 and the last two teams are relegated to National Division 4.

Participating teams and locations

League table

Sponsorship
National Division Three is part of the Courage Clubs Championship and is sponsored by Courage Brewery.

See also
 English Rugby Union Leagues
 English rugby union system
 Rugby union in England

References

N3
National League 1 seasons